Vegglifjell  is a mountain area in Buskerud and Telemark counties in southern Norway. Its highest point (at 1381 m) is the summit of Skirveggen (also spelled Skirveggin).

Mountains of Viken
Mountains of Vestfold og Telemark